Terrie Williams  (born May 12, 1954) is an American public relations speaker, author, therapist, and philanthropist.

Early life 
Williams' father, Charles, was born as one of five siblings and received his education through the military. Terrie's mother, Marie, had nine siblings and was the only one to complete high school. Terrie's family would often visit the St. Agatha home for children in Nanuet, NY and spent time with the orphan children for the weekend. These visits helped Terrie to develop compassion at a very young age, influencing who she is today.

Education
After high school, Williams continued to further her education at Brandeis University in Waltham, Massachusetts where she received a BA in Psychology and Sociology. She received the Alumni Achievement Award in 1988. "The Alumni Achievement Award recognizes alumni who have made distinguished contributions to their professions or chosen fields of endeavor. It represents the highest form of university recognition bestowed exclusively on alumni." Upon completion of her bachelor's degree, she went on to obtain a Master's of Science in Social Work at Columbia University.

Early career 

Upon obtaining her MS, Williams took a job as a medical social worker at New York Hospital (now called Weill-Cornell Medical Center) counselling terminally ill and physically challenged patients. At the hospital, she met and befriended jazz musician Miles Davis who encouraged her to open her own business, which Williams eventually did.

The Terrie Williams Agency 

In 1988 she founded The Terrie Williams Agency (TTWA), a public relations firm. Her first clients were Miles Davis and comedian Eddie Murphy.  The firm provides employee training and motivational speaking for various corporations, community-based organizations, and universities.
Over the years, it has represented public figures such as Prince, Chris Rock, Janet Jackson, Louis Gossett Jr., the Reverend Al Sharpton, Sean "Diddy" Combs, MoNique, Ntozake Shange, and the late Johnnie L. Cochran.  Corporate clients include HBO, Revlon, Time Warner, Essence magazine, and Forest City Ratner Companies.

Her work in public relations has been referenced in textbooks, business guides, print editorials, social media, and pop culture.
Since its creation in 1988, The Terrie Williams Agency has provided many of its services on a pro bono basis to underserved communities.

Battle with depression 

In 2003 Williams suffered a severe bout of depression. She was forced to put her public relations career on hold as she recovered from the illness. In a June 2005 interview with Essence magazine, "Depression and the Superwoman," she spoke candidly about the effects of depression. She specifically drew attention to the reluctance of African-Americans to seek treatment due to social stigmas against mental illness and a variety of other culturally-specific issues.

Since that time, she has become a mental health activist, lecturing across the country, and encouraging members of the public to come forward and discuss their own personal experiences with others in communal settings. She was commended<ref>Taylor, Susan L. Foreword. [https://books.google.com/books?id=MEgexbWBXTsC Pain: It Just Looks Like We’re Not Hurting] by Terrie M. Williams (p. xix)</ref> for using her high profile to break a nationwide taboo that had previously rendered mental illness unacceptable, invisible, and therefore largely untreated within African American communities. Black Pain was heralded as "a wake-up call, a conversation starter for the thousands, if not millions, of black people who fight to make it through one day into the next."

 Books 
Williams has written four books. Her first, The Personal Touch: What You Really Need to Succeed in Today's Fast-paced Business World  offered "an excellent primer on the basics of building and maintaining business relationships." The second book, Stay Strong: Simple Life Lessons for Teens  formed the basis of Williams' non-profit Stay Strong Foundation. A Plentiful Harvest: Creating Balance and Harmony Through the Seven Living Virtues, offers advice on how to parlay core values into sound business practices. In 2008, she wrote Black Pain: It Just Looks Like We're Not Hurting, which examines the role of unaddressed mental and emotional illness in spreading physical disease, substance abuse, violent crime, and broken families among African Americans.

 Philanthropy and activism 

In 2005, Terrie Williams founded the Stay Strong Foundation (SSF)—now dissolved. SSF worked to support, educate and inspire America's youth through a series of programs and events that are designed to raise awareness of teen issues, promote the personal well-being of young people and enhance their educational and professional development. The foundation encouraged corporate and individual responsibility, developed educational resources for youth and youth organizations, provided and coordinated internships, set up mentoring opportunities, and facilitated visits by prominent individuals and business professionals to schools, libraries, youth organizations, and group homes.

In March 2008, the Stay Strong Foundation launched the "Healing Starts With Us" campaign."Terrie Williams and Celebs Launch Campaign" Essence.com
In 2010 SSF collaborated with the Ad Council and the Substance Abuse and Mental Health Services Administration (SAMHSA) to introduce a campaign entitled "Share Ourselves: Healing Starts With Us." To date, the campaign has garnered $2.5 million in donated national advertising space and 11 million media impressions to significantly heighten awareness of the importance of mental and emotional health.

In October 2012, Williams was a featured speaker on mental health for World Mental Health Day.

 Awards and honors 

In 1991 Williams was the first (and remains the only) woman of color to receive the New York Women of Communications Matrix Award in the category of Public Relations
Public Relations Society of America /New York Chapter's 1995 Phillip Dorf Mentoring Award
In 1996, Williams was the first person of color to be awarded the Vernon C. Schranz Distinguished Lectureship at Ball State University
2006 Institute for the Advancement of Multicultural & Minority Medicine's Eagle Fly Free Award
In 2009 NAMI/FAMILYA of Rockland County recognized Williams' extraordinary commitment to de-stigmatizing mental illness by giving her their Florence Gould Gross Award
2009 Dr. David Satcher Mental Health Trailblazer Award—Jackson State University (Southern Institute for Mental Health Advocacy, Research and Training) 
2009 The Citizens Committee for New York City Marietta Tree Award for Public Service Ebony's 2010 "Power 150" for Activism
In 2009, Williams was listed among Woman's Day'' magazine's 50 "Women Who Are Changing The World"
The National Alliance on Mental Illness of New York City (NAMI-NYC Metro) 2010 award Honoring Pioneering Women in Mental Health
2011 Williams was named "PR Executive of the Year" at the MAAX Summit
2011 Heart & Soul Award honoree "For All You Do"
2011 Full Circle Health Award
2011 recipient of New Federal Theatre's 40th Anniversary Woodie King, Jr. Award
2011 Emmett Till Legacy Foundation's "Woman of Courage" Award
2011 The Khary Orr Leadership Award—African American Heritage Parade Committee
2012 SCLC Women Drum Major for Justice Award
2012 National Association of Social Workers-NYC Social Work Image Award
Williams was one of TheGrio.com's 100 in 2013
Terrie Williams was the 2013 Commencement Keynote Speaker for Metropolitan College of New York

References

External links 

 Terrie Williams Website 

 The Terrie Williams Agency, 1990-11-01, In Black America,  KUT Radio, American Archive of Public Broadcasting (WGBH and the Library of Congress)

1954 births
Living people
Writers from Mount Vernon, New York
Brandeis University alumni
Columbia University School of Social Work alumni
American publicists
20th-century American writers
21st-century American writers
20th-century American women writers
21st-century American women writers